The 1990 Minnesota gubernatorial election took place on November 6, 1990. Independent-Republican Party State Auditor and challenger Arne Carlson defeated then Minnesota Democratic–Farmer–Labor Party Governor Rudy Perpich, who had defeated Mike Hatch for the Democratic nomination.

The Independent-Republicans initially nominated businessman Jon Grunseth. Just over three weeks before the election, two women alleged that, in 1981, Grunseth had requested they swim nude during an Independence Day party at his home and, when they refused, he attempted to forcibly remove their swimsuits. The girls were 12 and 13 years old at the time of the incident. In response, Carlson — the runner-up in the Independent-Republican primary — announced a write-in candidacy, backed by US Senator Rudy Boschwitz. Despite denying the allegations (but admitting to past extramarital affairs), Grunseth dropped out of the race on October 28, just over a week before election day. The Independent-Republicans replaced him on the ballot with Carlson that day.

Results

References

External links
https://web.archive.org/web/20060425113929/http://www.sos.state.mn.us/docs/mn_leg_man_06_chapt7.pdf

Minnesota
Gubernatorial
1990